Milofanovo is a rural locality (a village) in Zelentsovskoye Rural Settlement, Nikolsky District, Vologda Oblast, Russia. The population was 131 as of 2002.

Geography 
Milofanovo is located 59 km northwest of Nikolsk (the district's administrative centre) by road. Senino is the nearest rural locality.

References 

Rural localities in Nikolsky District, Vologda Oblast